Sibhinis, Siobhanais  or Shivinish. is one of the Monach Islands, lying between Ceann Iar and Ceann Ear. It is tidal, and connected at low tide to Ceann Iar by Fadhail Shibhinis, and to Ceann Ear by Faodhail Chinn Ear. In the 16th century, a large tidal wave was said to have washed this away.

The island is about  acres in extent and has five temples which have long remained abandoned on the island.

See also

 List of islands of Scotland

References 

Monach Islands
Tidal islands of Scotland
Uninhabited islands of the Outer Hebrides